Ark clam is the common name for a family of small to large-sized saltwater clams or marine bivalve molluscs in the family Arcidae. Ark clams vary both in shape and size. They number about 200 species worldwide.

The shells of ark clams are often white or cream, but in some species, the shell is striped with, tinted with, or completely colored, a rich brown. In life the shell of most species has a top shell layer that is thick brown periostracum affixed to the harder calcareous part of the shell. In some species such as Barbatia, this outer horny covering is tufted at the end of the shell into something that resembles a beard, hence the name Barbatia or bearded one.

The group is known as "ark shells" because species such as Arca have a large flat area between the umbones which, in an undamaged shell, somewhat resembles a deck, with the rest of the shell perhaps illustrating an ancient wooden boat such as Noah's ark is thought to have been.

All ark shells have a long straight hinge line with a single row of numerous small and unspecialized "teeth". This is known as a "taxodont dentition" and represents an ancient ancestor. This kind of hinge line is also found in the bivalve families Glycymerididae, Nuculidae and Nuculanidae.

The thick outer skin or periostracum of an ark clam can act as camouflage, such that the shells can sometimes look like stones when lying on the bottom.

Large ark clams, such as Arca zebra, are commonly used as bait, as well as food, throughout the Caribbean.

Some ark clams species, such as the blood cockle (Anadara granosa, a.k.a. Tegillarca granosa) are raised in aquaculture, e.g. in the estuaries of China's Fujian coast.

Tegillarca granosa was used as a food by Indigenous peoples living on the northern Australian coastline through at least the past ~4500 years, with extensive evidence preserved in the form of shell mound sites.

Genera

Genera within the family Arcidae include:
 Acar Gray, 1857
 Anadara Gray, 1847
 Arca Linnaeus, 1758
 Barbatia Gray, 1847
 Bathyarca Kobelt, 1891
 Bentharca Verrill and Bush, 1898
 Larkinia  Reinhart, 1935
 Samacar Iredale, 1936
 Senilia Linnaeus, 1758
 Tegillarca Iredale, 1939

References

External links

 ITIS
 Archerd Shell Collection, Ark clams